Lechriolepis heres is a species of moth of the family Lasiocampidae described by William Schaus and W. G. Clements in 1893.

Distribution
It is found in Sierra Leone.

References

Lasiocampidae
Moths of Africa
Moths described in 1893